Olymos or Olymon (Ὄλυμον) or Hylimos (Ὕλιμος) was a town of ancient Caria. It was a polis (city-state) and a member of the Delian League.
 
Its site is located near Kafaca, Asiatic Turkey. Many inscriptions of the Hellenistic period have been recovered from the site.

References

Populated places in ancient Caria
Former populated places in Turkey
Greek city-states
Members of the Delian League
Ancient Greek archaeological sites in Turkey
Milas District
History of Muğla Province